This is a list of 1747 species in the genus Lasioglossum.

Lasioglossum species

A

B

C

D

E

F

G

H

I

J-K

L

M

N

O

P

Q-R

S

T

U-V

W-Z

References

Lasioglossum